Time Changes Everything is the debut solo album by the English guitarist John Squire, released in 2002 on his own North Country Records label.

The album contains many allusions to Squire's former band The Stone Roses, not least the cover which features an animal skull splattered with paint in the style of Jackson Pollock, a technique used by Squire for his covers of The Stone Roses debut album and its accompanying singles.  The songs "I Miss You" and "15 Days" both feature references to The Stone Roses  with many critics seeing the former as evidence of Squire's wish to end his long running feud with singer Ian Brown.

Critical reception
Time Changes Everything was met with "mixed or average" reviews from critics. At Metacritic, which assigns a weighted average rating out of 100 to reviews from mainstream publications, this release received an average score of 50 based on 7 reviews.

In a review for AllMusic, Anders Kaasen wrote: "Let there be no doubt: the singing on this record isn't pretty. Squire croons dementedly throughout the whole album, resembling several other distinctive vocalists. The production is altogether exquisite, giving Time Changes Everything a fittingly warm, organic, early-'70s sound; hammond organ, mellotron, and Fender Rhodes are features throughout the whole record. It is mainly due to his brilliance as a guitarist that John Squire has attained legendary status." Dorian Lynskey of The Guardian said: "Novice vocalist Squire has the voice of a pub singer who has settled on a grim amalgam of David Bowie and Bob Dylan. The music is small improvement: at best amiable Tom Pettyish country-rock, at worst Brothers in Arms by Dire Straits. If it were any more middle-of-the-road it would be a traffic island."

Chart performance
Time Changes Everything peaked at number 17 on the UK Official Albums Chart for the week of 22 September 2002, and number 5 in Scotland.

Track listing

Personnel
Credits adapted from AllMusic.

Musicians
John Squire – vocals, guitar, percussion
Jonathan White – bass
Andy Treacey – drums
Mark Heaney  - drums
John Ellis – piano, Hammond organ, Fender Rhodes, Mellotron, clavinet, saxophone, bass clarinet, snake charmer's pipe

Production
 Simon Dawson − engineer, producer
 Chris Blair − mastering

Charts

References

External links
 
 
 Official site

John Squire albums
2002 debut albums